Mounted police are police who patrol on horseback or camelback. Their day-to-day function is typically picturesque or ceremonial, but they are also employed in crowd control because of their mobile mass and height advantage and increasingly in the UK for crime prevention and high visibility policing roles. The added height and visibility that the horses give their riders allows officers to observe a wider area, and it also allows people in the wider area to see the officers, which helps deter crime and helps people find officers when they need them. When employed for crowd control, there is a risk that some people may be trampled (resulting in injuries or death). Due to this, authoritarian regimes often use mounted police to supress protests, as the public generally does not view these "accidental" deaths as resulting from a deliberate use of deadly force. In at least one case this has resulted in the police officer riding the horse (that caused the injury) to be sued.

Mounted police may be employed for specialized duties ranging from patrol of parks and wilderness areas, where police cars would be impractical or noisy, to riot duty, where the horse serves to intimidate those whom it is desired to disperse through its larger size, or may be sent in to detain trouble makers or offenders from the crowd. For example, in the UK, mounted police are most often seen at football matches, although they are also a common sight on the streets of many towns and cities as a visible police presence and crime deterrent during the day and night. Some mounted police units are trained in search and rescue due to the horse's ability to travel where vehicles cannot.

History 
The French Maréchaussée—direct predecessors of the gendarmerie and the first national police force in a modern sense—were a corps of completely mounted constabulary from their establishment in the early 18th century. Poor roads and extensive rural areas made horse-mounted police a necessity in European states until the early 20th century. 

The establishment of organized law-enforcement bodies throughout Africa, Asia and the Americas during the colonial and post-colonial eras made the concept of predominantly horse-police accepted almost world-wide. Notable examples include the Royal Canadian Mounted Police, the Mexican Rurales, the Rhodesian British South Africa Police, the Turkish/Cypriot Zapiteh and the caballeria (mounted branch) of the Spanish Civil Guard.

Equipment 

Tack used by mounted police is similar to standard riding tack, with adaptations for police use. Synthetic saddles are often favored over those made of natural leather to reduce weight, important both because of long riding hours and because police officers must carry numerous articles of personal equipment. High-traction horseshoes made of speciality metals or fitted with rubber soles are typically used in urban areas in place of standard steel horseshoes, which are prone to slip on pavement. Rubber soled shoes also produce less noise than steel shoes and jar the hoof less. 

Horses working in riot control wear facial armor, made of perspex so that the animals can still see. The officers themselves are often equipped with especially long wooden or polycarbonate batons for use on horseback, as standard patrol batons would have insufficient length to strike individuals at ground level.

Notable modern units

Australia

The New South Wales Mounted Police is a mounted section of the New South Wales Police Force, and the oldest continuous mounted group in the world. Currently they have a strength of 36 officers and around 38 mounts and their duties include traffic and crowd management, patrols, and ceremonial protocol duties.

Canada
The Royal Canadian Mounted Police (RCMP) is a well-known mounted police force, although horses are no longer in use operationally. However, horses are still used in the Musical Ride as well as by several provincial and municipal police detachments. In reference to their mounted heritage, current RCMP vehicle livery includes a silhouette of a horse and rider. 

A few other Canadian police forces have mounted units, including:

 Royal Newfoundland Constabulary has had a mounted unit since 1873, but full time after 2003; the unit has 4 horses.
 Toronto Police Service Mounted Unit - created in 1886 and has largest mounted unit among municipal police forces currently with 27 horses.  Upon request, the mounted unit may be deployed to other cities.
Halifax Regional Police Mounted Unit with 2 horses and 2 assigned riders
Hamilton Police Service - established January 2010 with 5 horses.
 Service de police de la Ville de Montréal Cavalry - oldest mounted unit (formed 1885) and currently with 8 horses.
 Calgary Police Service c. 1978 and currently with 6 horses.
 Vancouver Police Department Mounted Squad c. 1908 and reformed 1951 after disbanding in 1949; ~7 horses in the unit.

Oman
The Royal Oman Police have many horse and camel mounted troopers.

United Kingdom

The Metropolitan Police Mounted Branch is the mounted section of the Metropolitan Police, the police force of Greater London (excluding the City of London, where the separate City of London Police has its own mounted branch). The Mounted Branch was founded in 1760 and is the oldest section of the Metropolitan Police. The Metropolitan Police Mounted Branch undertakes crowd control duties, especially at football matches, but also conducts general street patrols and escorts the Royal Guard change every morning.

United States

Many cities in the United States have mounted units, New York having one of the largest with 55 horses as of 2016, The Houston, Texas Police Department's Mounted Patrol Unit was started in 1983 and now consists of 1 lieutenant, 4 sergeants and 24 officers. It has become increasingly well known due to the decision to remove the shoes of all its 38 mounted horses and embrace the concept of naturalizing their horses' diet and care.

Several American mounted units were disbanded or downsized in the 2010s. For example, units in Boston and San Diego were disbanded by 2011, while New York City’s mounted unit was reduced considerably over the last decade with 79 police officers and 60 horses in 2011 – down from the 130 officers and 125 horses it had before the downsizing. Philadelphia's mounted police unit was disbanded in 2004, but reinstated in 2011 with four horses from the disbanding unit of Newark, New Jersey. 

The United States Border Patrol had 200 horses in 2005. Most of these are employed along the U.S.-Mexico border. In Arizona, these animals are fed special processed feed pellets so that their wastes do not spread non-native plants in the national parks and wildlife areas they patrol.

See also 

: alternative for crowd control

References

External links

Informational site for mounted police officers
List of mounted search and rescue units
Mounted Police in France

 
Law enforcement units
Crowd control
Riot control
Law enforcement animals